Somebody Else's Coat is a 1927 Soviet comedy film directed by Boris Shpis, based on Veniamin Kaverin's short story "Government Inspector".

Cast
 Andrei Kostrichkin - Chuchugin
 Sergei Gerasimov - Skalkovsky
 Pyotr Sobolevsky - Galaev
 Yanina Zhejmo - Gulka
 Tamara Makarova - Dudkina

References

External links

1927 films
1927 comedy films
Soviet comedy films
Russian comedy films
Lenfilm films
Soviet black-and-white films
Soviet silent feature films
Films directed by Boris Shpis
Films based on short fiction
Russian black-and-white films
Russian silent feature films
Silent comedy films
1920s Russian-language films